Gul Bahar Singh is a six time national award winning Indian film-maker. He received first national award in 1986 for his documentary film, Anukaran.

Early life

Singh was born in Pakur, Jharkhand in a Sikh family and he is the youngest child of his parents. He studied in Pakur, Kolkata, and Faridabad, after completing his graduation Singh self-trained himself to become a filmmaker.

Career

He started his career in 1980 with his first documentary "Weeds" on street children, which received very good response. He received first national award in 1986 for his documentary film Anukaran, a film on status of women in India. In 1991 he received national award for film Biotechnology; Some possibilities.

He made a long documentary for Doordarshan on life of noted Hindi writer Munshi Premchand starred Irrfan Khan as Premchand. In 1999 Hindi feature film Sundari produced by N.F.D.C. was screened in Calcutta film festivals and Participated in Vith, International film festivals in Sochi, Moscow and received Diploma for participation. He also won National award in 44th National Film Awards as best film on Family welfare for Bengali short film Bheet and won National award in 45th National Film Awards for Gotipua. The Goal feature Irfan Khan in main lead won Golden Lotus at 47th National Film Awards as best children film and received special Jury award at 11th, Cairo International Children's Film Festival held in Egypt, received special mention by the jury of International Federation of Film Societies in 2001 in Czech Republic. The film was also selected in India Panorama in 2001, and also participated in Golden Elephant Children's Film Festival in the same year. His feature film Dattak starring Rajit Kapoor and A. K. Hangal as main lead was the only Indian film which participated in the 5th Shanghai International Film Festival, China. In 2016, he made a feature-length biopic Ek Thi Rani Aisi Bhi starring Hema Malini and Vinod Khanna on the life of Rajmata Vijaya Raje Scendia of Gwalior.

Awards

Filmography

References

External links

Living people
Indian filmmakers
Indian documentary film directors
Film directors from Jharkhand
20th-century Indian film directors
21st-century Indian film directors
People from Pakur district
Indian television directors
Hindi-language film directors
Year of birth missing (living people)
Film directors from Kolkata